The Primeira Liga (English: Premier League, also written as Liga Portugal 1), also known as Liga Portugal Bwin for sponsorship reasons, is the top level of the Portuguese football league system. Organised and supervised by the Liga Portugal, it is contested by 18 teams since the 2014–15 season, with the three lowest placed teams relegated to the Liga Portugal 2 and replaced by the top-three non-reserve teams from this division.

Founded in 1934 as Campeonato da Liga da Primeira Divisão, it was named Campeonato Nacional da Primeira Divisão from 1938 until 1999, when it was changed to its current naming. Over 70 teams have competed in the Primeira Liga, but only five have been crowned champions. Among them, the "Big Three" teams – Benfica (37 wins), Porto (30 wins) and Sporting CP (19 wins) – have won all but two Primeira Liga titles; the other winners are Belenenses (1945–46) and Boavista (2000–01).

The Primeira Liga has increased its reputation in recent years, occupying the sixth place of UEFA's national league ranking, as of 2021. It broke into the top five for the first time in the 2011–12 season, passing the French Ligue 1, one of the historical "big five" European leagues, for the first time since 1990. The Primeira Liga also reached a world ranking of fourth according to IFFHS's 2011 ranking.

History
Before the Portuguese football reform of 1938, a competition on a round-basis was already being held – the Primeira Liga (Premier League) and the winners of that competition were named "League champions". Despite that, a Championship of Portugal in a knock-out cup format was the most popular and defined the Portuguese champion, although the winners of this competition no longer count as Portuguese football champions.

Then, with the reform, a round-robin basis competition was implemented as the most important of the calendar and began defining the Portuguese champion. From 1938 to 1999, the name Campeonato Nacional da Primeira Divisão (National Championship of the First Division) or just Primeira Divisão (First Division), was used.

Porto won the inaugural edition of the new league championship and successfully defended the title in the next season. In 1939–40 the tournament was expanded from eight to ten clubs, due to an administrative battle between Porto and Académico do Porto, regarding a Regional Championship game that ended with only 43 minutes after the start, and later repeated (which FC Porto won) according to Porto FA decision. FPF came out with a decision to satisfy both clubs, expanding the championship to 10 teams (one more from Porto FA and another from Setúbal FA) and annulling the result from the repetition match. With this decision, FC Porto lost the Regional title and finished in 3rd, Leixões SC became the new regional champion, while Académico was 2nd place. All 3 teams qualified for 1939–40 Primeira Divisão.

In the 1941–42 season, it was decided to expand the championship from eight to ten teams to admit Braga FA and Algarve FA champions (until this season only the top teams from Porto, Coimbra, Lisboa and Setúbal were admitted). Porto finished the regional championship in third place again, which did not grant entry into the Primeira Liga. However, a second expand (from 10 to 12) in the same season was decided, which allowed the club to participate.

After the 1945–46 season, the qualifying system based on regional championships was abandoned and adopted a pyramid system, with relegations and promotions between the 3 tiers. The clubs in Primeira Divisão, Segunda Divisão and Terceira Divisão no longer had to play their district championships on the same season as they had been doing since the first seasons of the Liga. Below is a complete record of how many teams played in each season throughout the league's history;
 8 clubs: 1934–1939
 10 clubs: 1939–1940
 8 clubs: 1940–1941
 12 clubs: 1941–1942
 10 clubs: 1942–1945
 12 clubs: 1945–1946
 14 clubs: 1946–1971
 16 clubs: 1971–1987
 20 clubs: 1987–1989
 18 clubs: 1989–1990
 20 clubs: 1990–1991
 18 clubs: 1991–2006
 16 clubs: 2006–2014
 18 clubs: 2014–present

When the Portuguese League for Professional Football took control of the two nationwide leagues in 1999, it was renamed "Primeira Liga" (Premier League).

Big Three

"The Big Three" is a nickname for the three most powerful sports clubs in Portugal. With the exception of Belenenses in 1945–46 and Boavista in 2000–01, only three clubs have won the Primeira Liga title – Benfica (37 times), Porto (30) and Sporting CP (19). These three clubs generally end up sharing the top three positions (thus, appearing more frequently in UEFA competitions) and are the only clubs to have played in every season of the competition.

These clubs dominate Portuguese football, and it has become typical for fans to support any of these teams as a "first club", with a local team probably coming afterwards, if at all. The "Big Three" have the highest average attendance ratings every season in Portugal, while many other teams, lacking support from the locals, have suffered from poor attendance. The lack of support for local teams is considered to be one of the main reasons why Portuguese Football registers one of the worst attendance ratings in European Football's best championships, alongside the broadcast of almost all the games on television. In other sports, the rivalry between the big clubs is also considerable and it usually leads to arguments between the fans and players.

Benfica is the club with most league, cup and league cup titles, as well as the most domestic titles (81) and overall titles won (83 or 84, if the Latin Cup is taken into account), including back-to-back European Cup trophies. Porto is the club with most Portuguese Super Cups and international titles won (7).

Sporting CP holds the third place when it comes to the most league and cup titles. Benfica is the only Portuguese club to have won two consecutive European Cup/UEFA Champions League titles, reaching ten European finals: seven European Cups and three UEFA Cup/Europa League, and was runner-up in two Intercontinental Cups. Porto is the only Portuguese club since 1987 to have won any international competition (excluding the UEFA Intertoto Cup), gathering a total of two European Cup/UEFA Champions Leagues, two UEFA Cup/Europa Leagues, one European Super Cup and two Intercontinental Cups and finished runner-up in one European Cup Winner's Cup and three UEFA Super Cups. Sporting won one European Cup Winner's Cup and was runner-up in one UEFA Cup. Apart from the big three, Braga won the last UEFA Intertoto Cup and was runner-up in one UEFA Europa League.

Sponsored names
Galp Energia acquired the naming rights to the league in 2002, titling the division SuperLiga GalpEnergia. A four-year deal with the Austrian sports betting bwin was announced on 18 August 2005 amid questioning by the other gambling authorities in Portugal (the Santa Casa da Misericórdia and the Portuguese Casinos Association), who claimed to hold the exclusive rights to legal gambling games in Portuguese national territory. After holding the name Liga betandwin.com for the 2005–06 season, the name was changed to bwin LIGA in July 2006.

From the 2008–09 season to the 2009–10 season the league was named Liga Sagres due to sponsorship from Sagres beer. In 2010, they renewed the sponsorship from Sagres, but also got the sponsorship from ZON Multimédia. The league was named Liga ZON Sagres until 2013–14 after the sponsorship agreement between Sagres, ZON (now NOS) and the league ended. In 2015, the league was named Liga NOS until 2020–21 season. Since 2021, it is known as Liga Portugal Bwin.

Sponsorship names for seasons
 2002–2005: SuperLiga GalpEnergia
 2005–2006: Liga betandwin.com
 2006–2008: bwin LIGA
 2008–2010: Liga Sagres
 2010–2014: Liga ZON Sagres
 2014–2021: Liga NOS
 2021–: Liga Portugal Bwin

Official match ball

 2002–2004: Adidas Fevernova
 2004–2006: Adidas Roteiro
 2006–2007: Adidas +Teamgeist
 2008: Adidas Europass
 2008–2009: Adidas Europass Portugal
 2009–2010: Adidas Terrapass Liga Sagres
 2010–2011: Adidas Jabulani
 2011: Adidas Speedcell
 2012: Adidas Tango 12
 2013: Adidas Cafusa
 2014: Adidas Brazuca
 2015: Adidas Conext15
 2016: Adidas Errejota
 2016–18: Nike Ordem
 2018–19: Nike Merlin
 2019–20: Select Brillant Super TB
 2020–21: Select Brillant Super TB
 2021–22: Select Brillant Super TB

Competition
Since the 2014–15 season, there are 18 clubs in the Primeira Liga, up from 16 in the previous seasons. During the course of a season, each club plays all teams twice – once at their home stadium and once at their opponent's stadium – for a total of 34 games. At the end of each season, the two lowest placed teams are relegated to the Segunda Liga and the top two teams from Segunda Liga are promoted to the Primeira Liga.

Qualification for European competitions
The top teams in Primeira Liga qualify for the UEFA Champions League, with the top two teams entering the group stage directly. The third placed team enters the playoffs for the group stage of the UEFA Champions League; if they fail to qualify, they enter the UEFA Europa League, along with the fourth placed team and the Taça de Portugal cup winners. If the Taça de Portugal cup winners qualify for the UEFA Champions League through league placing, the berth is given to the fifth placed team.

UEFA ranking

UEFA League Ranking as of the 2021–22 season:
 
  English Premier League
  Spanish La Liga
  Italian Serie A
  German Bundesliga
  French Ligue 1
  Portuguese Primeira Liga
  Dutch Eredivisie
  Austrian Football Bundesliga
  Scottish Premiership
  Russian Premier League

Clubs

Attendance
Since the beginning of the league, there are three clubs with an attendance much higher than the others: Benfica, Porto and Sporting CP. They have also the biggest stadiums in Portugal, with more than 50,000 seats. Other clubs, such as Vitória de Guimarães and Braga, also have good attendances. Académica de Coimbra, Vitória de Setúbal, Boavista, Belenenses, and Marítimo are historical clubs, with more than 30 top-flight seasons, from the biggest Portuguese cities, and have also many supporters. However, they do not have big attendances nowadays. Their stadiums have between 10,000 and 30,000 seats.

The 2017–18 season saw the following average attendance by club:

List of champions and top scorers

 Before 1995–96, the points were awarded in a format of two points for a win. In that season, Primeira Liga switched to the now standard three points for a win system.
 (1) Porto saw six points subtracted for corruption allegations in the Apito Dourado, but they recovered those points in July 2017.

Performance by club
All Primeira Liga champions have come from either Lisbon or Porto.

All-time Primeira Liga table
The all-time Primeira Liga table is an overall record of all match results, points, and goals of every team that has played in Primeira Liga since its inception in 1934. The table is accurate as of the end of the 2021–22 season. For comparison, older seasons have been calculated according to the three-points-per-win rule.

Records

Team records
 In 1972–73, Benfica became the first team to win the Portuguese league without defeat, with 58 points in 30 games (28 wins and 2 draws), the best efficiency ever obtained (96.7%) where 2 points were awarded for a victory. In that season, Benfica set the Portuguese league and European leagues record for most consecutive victories (23) – 29 wins overall, between 1971–72 and 1972–73. Benfica also set the league record for the greatest margin of victory in points over the second-placed team (18 points) in a 2 points per win championship.
 In 1977–78, Benfica completed the Portuguese league unbeaten for the second time (21 wins and 9 draws).
 In 1990–91, Benfica achieved the highest number of wins in a single season – 32 (out of 38 matches).
 In 1998–99, Porto became the only team to win five consecutive titles.
 In 2010–11, Porto won the Portuguese league without defeat, with 84 points in 30 games (27 wins and 3 draws), the best efficiency ever obtained (93.3%) where 3 points were awarded for a victory. That season, Porto also set the league record for the greatest margin of victory in points over the second-placed team (21 points) in a 3 points per win championship.
 In 2012–13, Porto won the Portuguese league unbeaten for the second time (24 wins and 6 draws).
 In 2020–21, Sporting CP set the record for the longest unbeaten run in a single season with 32 matches (25 wins and 7 draws) out of 34.
 From 8 November 2020 to 21 April 2022, Porto set the record for the longest unbeaten run in the league: 58 matches (47 wins and 11 draws).
 In 2021–22, Porto achieved a record 91 points in the Portuguese league (29 wins and 4 draws in 34 games).

Individual records

Appearances

Top scorers

Player transfer fees

Television

2020–21 until 2022–23 
The league is currently distributed internationally by Sportfive.

Portugal
Within Portugal, Sport TV broadcasts all live Primeira Liga matches except Benfica's home matches which are broadcast live on Benfica TV.

International broadcasters

 Albania – Tring Sport
 Austria – Sportdigital and DAZN
 Belarus – Belarus 5
 Belgium – RMC Sport
 Bosnia and Herzegovina – Arena Sport
 Brazil – ESPN
 Brunei – Astro SuperSport
 Canada – GOLTV Play
 China – K-Ball
 Croatia – Arena Sport
 Cyprus – CytaVision
 Czech Republic – Sport1
 France – RMC Sport
 Georgia – Silk Sport
 Germany – Sportdigital and DAZN
 Greece – Cosmote TV
 Hungary – Sport1
 Indonesia – Mola
 Ireland – BT Sport
 Israel – Sport 1
 Italy – OneFootball
 Japan – SKY PerfecTV!
 Latin America – GOLTV
 Liechtenstein – Sportdigital
 Lithuania – Sport 1
 Luxembourg – RMC Sport and Sportdigital
 Macau – Macau Cable TV and TDM (when in overnight simulcast with RTP Internacional on Canal Macau)
 Malaysia – Mola, Astro SuperSport
 Montenegro – Arena Sport
 Netherlands – Ziggo Sport
 North Macedonia – Arena Sport
 Puerto Rico – GOLTV
 Poland -  Eleven Sports
 Romania – Prima Sport
 Russia – Match TV
 Serbia – Arena Sport
 Singapore – Mola
 Slovakia – Sport1
 Slovenia – Arena Sport
 Switzerland – Sportdigital and DAZN
 Turkey – S Sport
 Ukraine – Sport1
 United Kingdom – BT Sport
 United States – GOLTV
 Lusophone Africa – RTP (one game from one of the Big Three a week on RTP África and RTP Internacional), Sport TV África
 Worldwide – RTP (one game from one of the Big Three a week on RTP Internacional)

See also

 LPFP Primeira Liga Player of the Year
 Portuguese Golden Ball
 SJPF Player of the Month
 SJPF Young Player of the Month
 CNID Footballer of the Year
 Bola de Prata
 Campeonato Nacional Feminino
 List of sports attendance figures
 List of association football competitions in Portugal
 List of foreign Primeira Liga players

Notes

References

Sources

External links

  
 Portugal – List of Champions, RSSSF.com

 
1
Port
1934 establishments in Portugal
Sports leagues established in 1934
Professional sports leagues in Portugal